The 2013–14 season of the División de Honor de Waterpolo is the 91st season of top-tier water polo in Spain since its inception in 1925.

The season comprises regular season and championship playoff. Regular season started in October 2013 and finished on April 26, 2014. Top eight teams at standings play championship playoff.

Championship playoff will begin on 7 May with semifinals, with winners advancing to Final.

Atlètic-Barceloneta won its ninth title in a row (14 in total) after defeating CN Terrassa 3–0 in the Championship Finals.

Teams

Regular season standings

Source:

Championship playoffs

Semifinals

1st leg

2nd leg

Atlètic-Barceloneta won series 2–0 and advanced to Final.

3rd leg

Terrassa won series 2–1 and advanced to Final.

Final

1st leg

2nd leg

3rd leg

Atlètic-Barceloneta won Championship final series 3–0.

Relegation playoff
Playoff to be played in two legs. 1st leg to be played on 10 May and 2nd leg on 17 May. The overall winner will play in División de Honor 2014–15 and the loser one in Primera Nacional.

|}

1st leg

2nd leg

Concepción–Cdad Lineal won 23–22 on aggregate and remained in División de Honor.

Top goal scorers

(regular season only)

See also
 2013–14 División de Honor Femenina de Waterpolo

References

External links
 Real Federación Española de Natación
 Competition format
 Relegation playoff rules

División de Honor de Waterpolo
Seasons in Spanish water polo competitions
Spain
2013 in water polo
2014 in water polo
2013 in Spanish sport
2014 in Spanish sport